The 2008–09 Venezuelan Professional Baseball League season ( or LVBP):

Regular season standings

(C)Classified to the Round Robin

Round robin

(#)Aragua, Caracas and La Guaira played two extra-playoff-games:

1st Game: (C)Caracas defeated Aragua 5-2

2nd Game: (C)Aragua defeated La Guaira 3-1

(C)Classified to the Championship series.

Championship series

Tigres de Aragua LVBP 2008-2009 Champions

Awards

Most Valuable Player (Víctor Davalillo Award): Jesús Guzmán (Caracas)

Overall Offensive Performer of the year: Jesús Guzmán (Caracas)

Rookie of the year: Max Ramírez (La Guaira)

Comeback of the year: Wilfredo Romero (La Guaira)

Manager of the year (Chico Carrasquel Award): Frank Kremblas (Caracas)

Pitcher of the year (Carrao Bracho Award): David Austen (Zulia)

Closer of the year: Alex Serrano (Margarita)

Setup of the year: Luke Gregerson (Margarita)

Highlights

Jesús Guzmán finished with 67 RBI to set a new league record, surpassing the old mark of 67 set by Pete Koegel in the 1973-1974 season.

The Tigres de Aragua won their 3rd straight championship, becoming the 2nd team in VPBL history to do it.

LVBP seasons
Venezuelan Professional Baseball League season
Venezuelan Professional Baseball League season